Amy Keys (born September 15, 1967) is an American singer and vocal artist. She was signed to the Epic Records label and a solo album and several singles were released in 1989. She worked on Walt Disney movie soundtracks and as backing vocalist on studio recordings and live performances, most notably with Ringo Starr, Phil Collins, Toto and Johnny Hallyday.

Discography

Solo albums
 1989 - Lover's Intuition

See also
Touring and studio musicians of Phil Collins
Johnny Hallyday : Flashback Tour: Palais des sports 2006 ; La Cigale : 12-17 décembre 2006 (2006) ; Tour 66 : stade de France 2009 (2009) ; On Stage / 2012 Tour (2013) ; Rester vivant tour'' (2016) ; (Warner Music)
Toto (band)

References

External links
 
 Amy Keys. discogs.com

American singer-songwriters
American women singer-songwriters
20th-century African-American women singers
Living people
Place of birth missing (living people)
1967 births
African-American songwriters
21st-century African-American people
21st-century African-American women